Squadron Leader Ajjamada Boppayya Devayya MVC is the only Indian Air Force Officer to be posthumously awarded the Maha Vir Chakra (MVC). The Maha Vir Chakra is the second highest wartime gallantry award and is less in precedence only to the Param Vir Chakra. During the 1965 India-Pakistan War, Sqn Ldr A B Devayya (called 'Wings of Fire') was part of a strike mission (on the Pakistani airbase Sargodha) when he was attacked by an enemy aircraft. He shot down the enemy pursuer's plane but in the process his aircraft was damaged and he went missing. Presumably he died in Pakistani territory. 23 years later, in 1988, he was posthumously awarded the retrospective MVC award for this feat in the 1965 conflict.

Biography
Devayya was born on 24 December 1932, at Coorg, Karnataka. He was the son of Dr. Bopayya. In 1954 he was commissioned into the Indian Air Force as a pilot. During the outbreak of the 1965 war, he was an instructor at the Air Force Flying College. He was posted to No.1 "Tigers" Squadron and flew the Mystere IVa fighter bomber.

As a senior flying instructor, Squadron Leader Devayya was part of an aircraft strike mission which went to Sargodha airfield in Pakistan. Despite actually being a standby in case one of the first 12 aircraft dropped out, he joined the air battle. Devayya was intercepted by a PAF F-104 Starfighter flown by Pakistani pilot Flt. Lt. Amjad Hussain. Devayya successfully evaded the Starfighter's attacks. But the faster aircraft caught up with him and damaged his plane. Yet Devayya attacked the Starfighter and struck it. The Starfighter went down while the pilot Hussain ejected from his seat and parachuted. It is not known what happened to Devayya. The IAF Mysteres were short on fuel and efficiency. The Mystere aircraft was destroyed and it is assumed that Devayya died on Pakistani soil.

Aftermath
The IAF was not aware of what had happened to Devayya, first recording him missing and later declaring him dead. Later, a British writer, John Fricker, was commissioned by the Pakistani Air Force to write an account of the war derived from Pakistani sources in 1979. What led to Devayya's actual death still remains a mystery. It was revealed much later by Pakistan that Devayya's body was found almost intact by villagers not very far from Sargodha and buried.

From Fricker's work, the IAF realised what had truly happened and in 1988 announced that the Maha Vir Chakra was to be awarded to Devayya posthumously. This is the only posthumous Maha Vir Chakra that the IAF has received.

Mrs. Devayya accepted the posthumous Maha Vir Chakra awarded to her husband in 1988, nearly 23 years after the war. On 7 September 2009, the private bus stand circle in Madikeri in Kodagu was named after him.

See also
List of solved missing person cases: pre-2000

References

External links
 Tigers Over Sargodha

1932 births
1960s missing person cases
1965 deaths
Aviators killed by being shot down
Indian Air Force officers
Indian aviators
Indian military personnel killed in action
Kodava people
Missing person cases in Pakistan
People from Kodagu district
Pilots of the Indo-Pakistani War of 1965
Recipients of the Maha Vir Chakra